Hans-Jürgen Treder (born 4 September 1928 in Berlin; died 18 November 2006 in Potsdam) was a German theoretical physicist and in the GDR, specializing in general relativity (and its extensions), astrophysics, and cosmology. He also had an interest in the history of science and philosophy.

Life

Education

Treder took an early interest in physics, displaying talent in the subject. As a student in 1944, he sought contact with Werner Heisenberg in Berlin, later to meet and communicate with him. After the second world war he studied at the Humboldt University of Berlin in physics and philosophy.

PhD and research

In 1956 he was awarded his doctorate from the Humboldt University of Berlin. In 1957, he became a research assistant at the Research Institute of Mathematics of the German Academy of Sciences at Berlin. Immediately after earning a Habilitation in 1962, in 1963 he became professor of theoretical physics at Humboldt University of Berlin and director of the Academy Institute of Pure Mathematics. With work on gravitational radiation at that time he earned international recognition. In 1965, he was instrumental in organizing the conference for the 50th anniversary of the publication of Einstein's field equations.

Positions and affiliations

In 1966 he became a full member of the German Academy of Sciences and was Director of the Berlin-Babelsberg Observatory of the Academy of Sciences. Following reorganization in 1969, he headed the newly established Central Institute for Astrophysics (ZIAP), in which the previously independent observatories in Potsdam, the Babelsberg Observatory, the Sonneberg Observatory and the Karl Schwarzschild Observatory, Tautenburg were summarized. Until 1973, he also led the research field of cosmic physics at the Academy of Sciences, in astrophysics and geophysics. Then he gave to health reasons and focused on the management of the ZIAP. He not only made it a center of theoretical gravitational physics, but also included magnetohydrodynamics (MHD, in collaboration with Max Steenbeck) - which played an important role in astrophysics on a par with the gravitational theory in the model training - and geophysics (in collaboration with Hans Ertel), which was formative in Potsdam later.

On Albert Einstein's 100th Birthday, 1979, he managed to secure a summer house by Einstein in Caputh, Brandenburg as a guest of the Academy in consultation with the administrators of the estate of Otto Nathan and Einstein. In 1982 he handed over the ZIAP to his successor, Karl-Heinz Schmidt. Treder was director and founder of the Laboratory of Einstein Academy in Potsdam Caputh he remained until 1992. He has published in the last years of his life with his friend, the geophysicist Wilfried Schröder, many works in the Earth and space physics, including solar variability. In addition, the edition of the book Einstein and geophysics, as well as some volumes of the works of Hans Ertel. Focus of their work was the solar minima (Sporer, Maunder and Dalton minima) and the physical consequences for the solar activity. Treder was chairman of the International Society "History of Geophysics and Cosmical Physics".

Treder enjoyed high reputation in the GDR (he received include the National Prize of the GDR) and the full confidence of the political leadership, and he enjoyed privileges such as full freedom to travel and own chauffeur driven car. Calls from the West declined from Treder, he was not only an avowed Marxist, but also felt the history of science in Berlin closely connected, about which he later wrote some books.

He lived later on the grounds of the Babelsberg Observatory, but was increasingly maverick and was after the turn not retain its leading role in the scientific organization, from which he had but retired early as the 1980s, when he turned increasingly to the History of Science and the philosophy of science turned (he led such a correspondence with Karl Popper).

Treder was a member of the Leibniz-Sozietät.

Works 

He unfolded a high scientific productivity and published nearly 500 individual contributions and more than 20 monographs.

Monographs on gravitational physics

Gravitational shock waves. Non-analytic wave solutions of Einstein's field equations, Akademie-Verlag, Berlin 1962

The history of science, philosophy of science

Some popular writings of Treder:

Books

Essays

References

External links

1928 births
2006 deaths
20th-century German physicists
German relativity theorists
German astrophysicists
German cosmologists
Humboldt University of Berlin alumni
Scientists from Berlin
Members of the German Academy of Sciences at Berlin